Ricardo Sánchez Mujica (born 1983) is a Venezuelan politician and former student leader.

Career 
He was elected as María Corina Machado's substitute legislator in the 2010 Venezuelan parliamentary election, representing Un Nuevo Tiempo. Sánchez was elected President of the Federación de Centros Universitarios (FCU) at the Central University of Venezuela in 2007 and re-elected in 2008, and was one of the most prominent student leaders during 2007 protests against the television channel RCTV shutdown, and the 2007 Venezuelan constitutional referendum. In 2008 Sánchez was named by the United Nations Economic and Social Council as youth ambassador for the promotion of peace in the Americas. Sánchez has suffered several attacks by unknown people, including an incendiary device thrown at his car in 2006, and an assault in 2009.

In November 2012 Sánchez was one of three opposition substitute legislators who broke away from the Mesa de la Unidad Democrática opposition coalition.

In 2015 he was a candidate for deputy to the National Assembly for the pro-government Great Patriotic Pole (GPP) and joined the ranks of Chavism, and would be later elected as member of the 2017 Constituent National Assembly.

References

1983 births
People from San Cristóbal, Táchira
Central University of Venezuela alumni
George Washington University alumni
Living people
Movimiento Estudiantil (Venezuela)